Pratibadi Kalam, formerly Kalamer Shakti, is an Indian Bengali language daily newspaper published from Agartala, Tripura. Anal Roy Choudhury is the founder and chief editor of the newspaper.

See also 
 Agartala

References 

Bengali-language newspapers published in India

External links 

 PRATIBADI KALAM